Watauga Dam is a hydroelectric and flood control dam on the Watauga River in Carter County, in the U.S. state of Tennessee. It is owned and operated by the Tennessee Valley Authority, which built the dam in the 1940s as part of efforts to control flooding in the Tennessee River watershed. At , Watauga is the second-highest dam in the TVA river and reservoir system (behind only Fontana), and at the time of its completion was one of the highest earth-and-rock dams in the United States.

Its namesake, the Watauga River, was named after a Cherokee settlement—the Watauga Old Fields—once located along the river at modern Elizabethton. It was listed on the National Register of Historic Places on August 11, 2017.  The top of the dam is crossed by the Appalachian Trail,

Location
Watauga Lake stretches for  along the river, nearly reaching the Tennessee-North Carolina state line, and includes parts of Carter County and Johnson County in Tennessee. Roan Creek, Cobb Creek, and the Elk River form substantial embayments along the reservoir.

Capacity

Watauga's powerhouse is located nearly a mile downstream from the dam, and is connected to the reservoir intake by a  tunnel.  Just above the powerhouse, the tunnel splits into two steel conduits that carry the water to a valve house just above the turbines.

Background and construction

In the 1920s, the Holston River Power Company began making plans for a large-scale dam-building project in the South Fork Holston River watershed, and had identified two possible dam sites along the Watauga, one of which was the current site of Watauga Dam (the company called it the "Cardens Bluff" site). In the early 1940s, the Tennessee Valley Authority, which had assumed oversight of flood control operations in the Tennessee River watershed in the previous decade, suggested a dam at the Cardens Bluff site to provide badly needed flood storage and help with the region's World War II energy demands. The dam project garnered widespread local support, especially from Elizabethton, which had been ravaged by a flood in 1940. The Watauga project was authorized December 17, 1941, and work on the dam began on February 16, 1942.

The town of Butler had to be moved. In October 1942, the U.S. War Production Board ordered TVA to halt the Watauga project, deeming it unnecessary for the nation's wartime needs. TVA spent several weeks securing the dam site and tunnel, and the project was set aside until the end of the war. Construction proceeded on May 22, 1946.

Watauga Dam was completed, and its gates opened December 1, 1948.  The dam's first generator went online August 30, 1949, and the second went online September 29, 1949.  The total cost of the Watauga project was just over $32 million.

Popular culture
The Old Crow Medicine Show song "Half Mile Down", on the 2012 album Carry Me Back, is about the flooding of the narrator's home town (Butler, Tennessee) due to the construction of the dam.

See also

South Holston Dam

References

External links

 Watauga Dam Project Film, ca. 1942-1949 -- Film of the dam's construction

Watauga Reservoir — official TVA site
Watauga Reservoir — Tennessee Wildlife Resources Agency

Dams on the Watauga River
Dams in Tennessee
Tennessee Valley Authority dams
Buildings and structures in Carter County, Tennessee
Hydroelectric power plants in Tennessee
Dams completed in 1948
Energy infrastructure completed in 1949